Dmytro Grabovskyy (30 September 1985 – 23 January 2017) was a Ukrainian professional road bicycle racer, who last competed for UCI Continental team  before his death in 2017.

Career
He was second in the time trial for juniors at the 2005 World Championship Cycling in Madrid and he won the road race. After two years he joined  in 2009: after two years there he joined ISD-Lampre for 2011, his final year as a professional. He competed in one Grand Tour during his career, the 2009 Giro d'Italia. In a 2010 interview with Gazetta dello Sport he admitted that he had suffered from problems with alcoholism during his period with Quick-Step, to the point where he came close to death from alcohol poisoning on two occasions.

He took up Israeli citizenship in 2015. Grabovskyy died from a heart attack on 23 January 2017.

Major results 

2003
2nd  Time trial, UCI Junior Road World Championships
2005
 UCI Under-23 Road World Championships
1st  Road race
2nd  Time trial
 1st  Time trial, UEC European Under-23 Road Championships
1st Stage 5 Five Rings of Moscow
2006
 1st  Time trial, UEC European Under-23 Road Championships
 1st  Overall Giro delle Regioni
1st Stages 2, 3 & 5b
 2nd Overall Girobio
1st Stage 2
2nd Time trial, National Under-23 Road Championships
2007
3rd Time trial, National Road Championships
2008
5th Firenze–Pistoia
2009
2nd Time trial, National Road Championships
2010
 1st  Mountains classification, Tirreno–Adriatico
2015
 3rd Overall Israman Negev Israel (1st Israeli)

References

External links

1985 births
2017 deaths
Ukrainian male cyclists
Sportspeople from Simferopol
Ukrainian emigrants to Israel